The Raid is a 2011 Indonesian action thriller film written, directed and edited by Gareth Evans. The film stars Iko Uwais, who previously worked with Evans in another action film, Merantau, released in 2009. In the film, an elite squad is tasked to infiltrate a high-rise building run by a ruthless drug lord in the slums of Jakarta; among them is Rama (played by Uwais), a veteran member of the team.

After its world premiere at the Toronto International Film Festival (TIFF), The Raid received positive reviews from critics. The name of the film was changed to The Raid: Redemption in the United States as distributor Sony Pictures Classics could not secure the rights to the title; it also allowed Evans to plan out future titles in the series. The US release of the film features a film score composed by Mike Shinoda and Joseph Trapanese. It was released in the United States on DVD and Blu-ray on 14 August 2012.

A sequel, The Raid 2, was released in 2014. Both films showcase the traditional Indonesian martial art of pencak silat, with fight choreography led by Uwais and Yayan Ruhian. A third film was considered but Evans decided not to go forward with the project.

Plot
Rookie Brimob officer Rama trains before joining a 20-man squad led by Sergeant Jaka and Lieutenant Wahyu for a raid on an apartment block with the intent of arresting crime lord Tama Riyadi. Together with his lieutenants Andi and Mad Dog, Tama runs the block and allows criminals and addicts to rent rooms under his protection. Arriving undetected, the team sweeps the first floor and subdue various tenants; they also meet a law-abiding tenant named Gofar delivering medicine to his sick wife. Continuing to the sixth floor, the team is spotted by two young lookouts, one of whom raises the alarm.

Tama calls in reinforcements, including a pair of snipers who pick off officers guarding the block's exterior, and a group of gunmen who destroy the truck they are using. Taking advantage of the chaos outside, Tama's men successfully set themselves free and manage to regain control of the first five floors. Tama then cuts the lights and announces over the PA system that the rest of the officers are on the sixth-floor stairwell, and that he will grant permanent residence to those who kill them. Wahyu confesses to Jaka that he staged the mission so he can eliminate Tama, who is in league with corrupt police officials, including himself; the mission is not officially sanctioned by police command, and there will be no reinforcements. The remaining team members are ambushed by shooters from above and are almost completely wiped out.

The remaining officers—Rama, Bowo, Jaka, Wahyu, Dagu, Alee, Hanggi and one other—retreat to an empty apartment and are cornered by more armed thugs. Rama uses an axe to create a hole in the floor so the team can descend to the lower level. Dropping to the room below, the team struggles to fend off Tama's thugs; Alee, Hanggi and an other officer are killed and Bowo is gravely wounded. Rama uses a propane tank to construct an improvised explosive device that eliminates the invading henchmen. With more of Tama's reinforcements approaching, the team splits into two groups: Jaka, Dagu, and Wahyu retreat to the fifth floor, while Rama and Bowo ascend.

After fighting a group of assassins, Rama and Bowo locate Gofar's apartment, and Gofar reluctantly hides the officers inside. Gangs wielding machetes search the apartment but fail to find them. After tending to Bowo's wounds, Rama leaves to search for Jaka's group. Rama encounters the machete gang and defeats them in a long fight, tackling their leader through a window and plummeting onto a fire escape below. On the sixth floor, he finds Andi, who has murdered two of Tama's men. Andi is revealed to be his estranged brother, whom Rama signed up for the mission to search for, at the urging of their father. Rama refuses to leave the building without his comrades, and Andi refuses to abandon his criminal life. Rama parts ways with his brother to search for his surviving colleagues.

Mad Dog discovers Jaka and his group on the fourth floor. Wahyu runs off, and Jaka instructs Dagu to protect him. Mad Dog challenges Jaka to hand-to-hand combat; he ultimately gains the upper hand and kills Jaka, by breaking his neck. Mad Dog then meets up with Andi to report back to Tama. Tama, having learned of Andi's treachery through his surveillance cameras, attacks and incapacitates Andi. Rama regroups with Dagu and Wahyu, and they head for Tama on the 15th floor, fighting through a narcotics lab along the way. Rama separates from Dagu and Wahyu when he discovers Mad Dog torturing Andi. Mad Dog lets Rama free Andi and fights them both. After a long and brutal fight, Mad Dog is ultimately killed by Rama and Andi.

Meanwhile, Wahyu and Dagu confront Tama. Wahyu kills Dagu before taking Tama hostage. Tama taunts Wahyu by revealing that he knew they were going to raid the building, that Wahyu was set up by his corrupt superior Reza, and that he will be killed regardless. A panicked and desperate Wahyu kills Tama and then attempts suicide, only to find he is out of ammunition. Andi uses his influence to allow Rama to leave with the injured Bowo and a detained Wahyu. Andi also hands over blackmail recordings Tama made of the corrupt officials he dealt with, telling him to contact Officer Bunawar. Rama asks Andi to come home, but Andi refuses and asserts that he can protect Rama inside this criminal underworld, but that Rama cannot do the same for him on the outside. As Rama, Bowo and Wahyu leave, Andi turns around and walks back to the apartment block, smiling for the first time.

Cast
 Iko Uwais as Rama, one of the rookie members of the special forces unit tasked with raiding Tama's building. One of the few survivors of the raid. Uwais previously worked with Evans in Merantau. Having lived for four years in Indonesia and learned about the country's predominant religion, director Gareth Evans implicitly integrated the Muslim faith in Uwais' character.

 Joe Taslim as Jaka, the Sergeant who leads his unit into the raid. Having been a fan of Merantau, the former judo champion Taslim contacted Evans through Facebook for their next project. As Evans was browsing through Taslim's profile, he came across a photo of him in a SWAT uniform and felt that it resonated with the character. Evans had him undergo choreography and drama auditions, with Taslim earning the role having aced them both.
  as Tama Riyadi, a ruthless drug lord who is the boss of the apartment building. Evans wanted a non-stereotypical take on the character, citing most gangster films wherein the boss is usually wearing a pristine suit and smoking cigars.
 Yayan Ruhian as Mad Dog, a skilled fighter who is the muscle behind Tama's operation. Ruhian previously worked with Evans in Merantau as an actor and fight choreographer. Evans cast Ruhian in the film as he wanted him to play a "purely evil" character, opposite to that which he played in his debut film which had a "redeemable value". 
 Donny Alamsyah as Andi, Tama's consigliere who is also Rama's estranged elder brother. Alamsyah also played Uwais' character's brother in Merantau. Since he regretted not being able to do action scenes in Merantau, Alamsyah approached Evans as they prepared for The Raid, earning the role having aced the audition.
 Iang Darmawan as Gofar, a tenant of the building who tends to his ill wife. Prior to the film, Darmawan's acting credits had been in sketch comedies, and The Raid marks his transition to a serious role.
 Pierre Gruno as Wahyu, the Lieutenant who arranges the eponymous raid to take out Tama. One of the few survivors of the raid.
 Tegar Satrya as Bowo, the hothead member of the team who is wounded attempting to save the life of a teammate. One of the few survivors of the raid.
 Eka Rahmadia as Dagu, a skilled fighter and team member who protects Lt. Wahyu as they make their way towards Tama. A Taekwondo practitioner, Rahmadia is part of the Piranha Stunt Team who helped with the film's shooting.
 Alfridus Godfred as leader of the machete gang, a priest who hunts the surviving officers when Jaka and Rama split into two groups.
Other cast members include Henky Solaiman and Fikha Effendi, who play Rama's father and wife, respectively. Verdi Solaiman, Ananda George and Yusuf Opilus appear as officers Budi, Ari and Alee, respectively.

Production

Development and pre-production
It was in that country that he met Iko Uwais, a Silat practitioner who was then working as a delivery man for a phone company based in Jakarta. Evans then nudged his wife to cast Uwais for Merantau, and then in The Raid.

Following Merantau, Evans and his producers began work on a Silat film project called Berandal (Indonesian for Thugs), a large-scale prison gangster film intended to star not only Merantau actors Uwais and Yayan Ruhian but also an additional pair of international fight stars. A teaser trailer was shot, but the project proved more complex and time-consuming than anticipated. After a year and a half, Evans and the producers found themselves with insufficient funds to produce Berandal, so they changed the film to a simpler but different story with a smaller budget. They called the project Serbuan Maut (The Raid). Producer Ario Sagantoro considers the film to be lighter than Merantau. Evans also considers it to be "a lot more streamlined," stating that "Merantau is more of a drama" while The Raid is more of a "survival horror film." Evans wanted The Raid vastly different from Merantau in terms of pacing. With Merantau, some fans complained the action sequences took too long to appear since the first 45 minutes of the film laid emphasis on character development, backdrop (specifically, the Indonesian culture) and drama. Therefore, Evans designed The Raid to be a "full-on" action film.

Pre-production took about four months, which include finalization of the script (which included translation of the original English-language script into Indonesian) and the work on choreography for the fighting sequences, which were designed by Iko Uwais and Yayan Ruhian. The actors that make up the key members of the police squad were sent to bootcamp military training with KOPASKA, where they learned how to use weapons, and how to perform strategic attack and defense techniques.

Filming
The crew wanted The Raid to be shot in a quasi-documentary style, that is, the camera is handheld and without the use of Steadicam. To achieve that objective, they shot the film in high definition using Panasonic AF100 camcorder—which had just recently come out of the market—and strayed from using film format while shooting most action and fight sequences. In addition, the camera was frequently attached to a Fig Rig to prevent most scenes from being too jarring, and give the camera operator opportunities to change angles and positions rapidly.

All guns used in the film were Airsoft replicas, to avoid the costs associated with having to deal with firearms. All the shots of the guns' actions cycling, muzzle flashes and cases ejecting were added digitally.

Editing

When filming concluded, about 120 minutes of footage was shot; Evans originally intended it to be eighty to eighty-five minutes long. The footage was eventually cut down to approximately 100 minutes. The final stages of post-production took place in Bangkok, Thailand for the color grading and audio mixing processes.

Soundtrack

While the film was still in production, in May 2011, Sony Pictures Worldwide Acquisitions acquired the distribution rights of the film for the US market and tasked Mike Shinoda of Linkin Park and Joseph Trapanese to create a new score. The film premiered at the 2011 Toronto International Film Festival with the original score from the Indonesian version which was composed by Aria Prayogi and Fajar Yuskemal, who also composed Evans's previous film Merantau. The Raid made its debut in the US with Trapanese and Shinoda's version at Sundance 2012.

Shinoda stated that his score was over 50 minutes and almost all instrumental. After film production, he had room for two more songs, but did not want to sing or rap, so he posted pictures of two music artists. Deftones/††† frontman Chino Moreno guest performed "RAZORS.OUT", which was leaked online on 16 March 2012, as rap group Get Busy Committee performed "SUICIDE MUSIC" for the film.

Release
The film was marketed internationally through Celluloid Nightmares, a partnership between US-based XYZ Films and France's Celluloid Dreams.

Sony Pictures Worldwide Acquisitions acquired the film's distribution rights for the United States, Latin America and Spain, revised the film score, and changed the title to The Raid: Redemption for the US release. Distribution rights to other countries were sold to Kadokawa Pictures for Japan, Koch Media for Germany, Alliance Films for Canada, Momentum Pictures for the United Kingdom, Madman Entertainment for Australia, SND HGC for China, and Calinos Films for Turkey. Deals were also made with distributors from Russia, Scandinavia, Benelux, Iceland, Italy, South Korea and India, during the film screening at the TIFF.

Reception

Box office
In Indonesia, the film sold 1,844,817 tickets at the box office in 2012.

Overseas, in its Sony Pictures Classics debut in the United States on 23–25 March 2012, The Raid: Redemption grossed $220,937 from 24 theaters for a location average of $15,781. For its widest opening release weekend in the United States and Canada on 13–15 April 2012, the film grossed $961,454 from 881 theaters, and ranked 11th overall. In the United Kingdom, the film grossed $660,910 on its opening weekend. In Indonesia, approximately 250,000 people watched the film in the first four days of release, and it was considered a great turnout for a country that only has about 660 theater screens nationwide. As of 8 July 2012, the film has grossed $4,105,123 in North America. The film grossed approximately $9.3 million overseas outside of Indonesia.

Home media
In the United States, the film grossed  on DVD and Blu-ray, .

In the United Kingdom, it was 2012's fifth-best-selling foreign-language film on physical home video formats. It was later the UK's overall best-selling foreign-language film of 2013 on home video.

Critical response
On Rotten Tomatoes, the film has an approval rating of 87% based on reviews from 172 critics, with an average score of 7.50/10. The website's consensus was "No frills and all thrills, The Raid: Redemption is an inventive action film expertly paced and edited for maximum entertainment." On Metacritic, the film has a weighted average score of 73 out of 100 based on reviews from 31 critics, indicating "generally favorable reviews".

Peter Bradshaw of The Guardian gave the film 5 out of 5, and said "This violent, intense and brilliant bulletfest from Indonesia puts western action movies to shame." Bilge Ebiri of Vulture.com wrote: "Once the action starts—and it starts very quickly—The Raid is relentless, breathtaking in its sheer propulsive majesty. But it's also shot through with moments of bleak poetry amid the carnage." Robert Koehler of Variety praised the director: "Taking the genre to a higher level of intensity, the Welsh-born Evans continues what he started in previous Indonesia-set actioner "Merantau," but this picture will seal his cult status." Michael Phillips of the Chicago Tribune wrote: "The whole film is. "The Raid" is maniacal in its pacing and assault tactics. It's also, absurdly, rated R. Fantastic. I love that a film this gory secured the same Motion Picture Association of America rating as "The King's Speech."
Owen Gleiberman of Entertainment Weekly called it "fists of fury mixed with torture porn" noting the variety of gory action sequences, but criticized the incoherent narrative. He gave it a B− grade.

Roger Ebert of the Chicago Sun-Times gave the film one star out of four; he criticized the lack of character depth, and noted "the Welsh director, Gareth Evans, knows there's a fanboy audience for his formula, in which special effects amp up the mayhem in senseless carnage." Ebert was criticized for his assessment, and later published a defense of his review.

Accolades

The film received numerous awards and nominations from both local and international institutions. At the 2012 Maya Awards, which is dubbed by local media as the Indonesian version of the Golden Globes, the film received 10 nominations. The Raid did not receive any nominations at the 2012 Citra Awards (the Indonesian equivalent to the Academy Awards); which was considered a snub.

Sequel and remake

Sequel

While developing The Raid in script form, Evans started to toy around with the idea of creating a link between it and his initial project, Berandal. It was later confirmed that Berandal would serve as a sequel to The Raid. Evans has also stated his intention to make a trilogy. Sony pre-bought the US, Latin American and Spanish rights to the sequel. Alliance/Momentum bought the rights to the United Kingdom and Canada; Koch Media acquired the film for German-speaking territories; Korea Screen acquired the rights to Korea; and HGC acquired the rights to China. Deals for other major territories were also in negotiations. Subtitled Berandal for the Indonesian market and simply The Raid 2 for the US and English-speaking market, the sequel had a "significantly larger" budget than its predecessor, and its filming included approximately 100 days of shooting. Pre-production began in September 2012 while filming began in January 2013.

On the release of The Raid 2 in 2015, Evans said he had ideas for The Raid 3 but that nothing had been written yet and a third film was not likely to happen before 2018 or 2019. In a 21 November 2016 interview with Impact Online, director Evans revealed the sequel was on hold with the franchise likely having ended, stating "Moving back to UK felt like a closing chapter on that franchise—we ended the story pretty neatly (I feel) in Part 2. I'm aware there's an interest for it  So never say never, but it's unlikely to happen anytime soon." In September 2018 Evans again stated that he felt the story was complete and that a third film was highly unlikely.

American remake
A few months after Sony acquired the film's North American distribution rights, it was announced by The Hollywood Reporter that its subsidiary company, Screen Gems, had begun negotiations to produce a Hollywood remake. The deal was completed in November 2011, with writer-director Gareth Evans to serve as an executive producer of the remake. XYZ Films, executive producers on the original Indonesian version, will be producers on the American version. Screen Gems also wants the same choreographers from The Raid involved with the remake. On 21 February 2014, the studio picked Patrick Hughes to direct the remake. A day later, reports stated that both Chris and Liam Hemsworth were being eyed for roles by the studio. On 27 May 2014, Variety reported that the film's production was delayed until early 2015. On 13 June 2014, Frank Grillo was the first to be announced to star in the remake, and is a fan of the original. On 16 June 2014, Geek Tyrant revealed that the remake will be set in the near future. On 4 August 2014, TheWrap reported that Taylor Kitsch has been cast in the lead role, and also that XYZ Films is returning to produce the remake, which is expected to hew closely to the original film. On 22 August 2014, Hughes revealed that describes his version as being in the vein of Black Hawk Down and Zero Dark Thirty with 12 integral roles. According to Tracking Board, on 23 October 2015, both Screen Gems and Kitsch had dropped out of the project and Hughes also dropped out as director. In February 2017, XYZ Films revealed that Joe Carnahan will produce and direct the remake with Evans as a producer. On 10 January 2022, Deadline reported that the remake will premiere on Netflix with Patrick Hughes directing alongside Michael Bay producing and Evans executive produced.

Comics and animation
A graphic novel based on The Raid was released on 21 May 2012 in Indonesia.

A stop-motion short depicting the plot of The Raid as clay-animated cats, made by Lee Hardcastle released on 11 May 2012, was included in the special features disc. A flash animated teaser trailer spoof depicting The Raid as a '90s anime, made by Philip Askins released on 19 May 2012, was also included in the special features.

On 22 June 2016, The Hollywood Reporter announced Titan Comics had teamed up with Gareth Evans and XYZ Films for a comic book spin-off series featuring "original stories featuring characters from The Raid movie series" with a launch date expected for late 2016.

See also 
 BuyBust, a 2018 Philippine film with a similar premise
 Dredd, a 2012 science fiction action film with a similar premise (instead of a group of police officers, it features only 2)

References

External links
 
 
 
 

2011 action films
2011 crime action films
2011 films
2011 independent films
Films about the illegal drug trade
Films directed by Gareth Evans
Films scored by Joseph Trapanese
Films set in apartment buildings
Films set in Indonesia
Films shot in Indonesia
Indonesian action thriller films
Indonesian martial arts
2010s Indonesian-language films
Indonesian martial arts films
Plaion
Maya Award winners
Silat films
Stage 6 Films films